Acleotrema is a genus of monopisthocotylean monogeneans in the family Diplectanidae. All its species are parasites on fish.
The type-species is Acleotrema girellae Johnston & Tiegs, 1922.

Heteroplectanum Rakotofiringa, Oliver & Lambert, 1987  is considered a junior synonym of Acleotrema.

Species
According to the World Register of Marine Species, species include:

 Acleotrema diplobulbus (Yamaguti, 1968) Domingues & Boeger, 2007
 Acleotrema flabelliforme (Lim, 2006)
 Acleotrema girellae Johnston & Tiegs, 1922
 Acleotrema lamothei Santos, Bianchi & Gibson, 2008
 Acleotrema nenue (Yamaguti, 1968) Dominques & Boeger, 2007
 Acleotrema nenuoides (Rakotofiringa, Oliver & Lambert, 1987) 
 Acleotrema oliveri (León-Régagnon, Pérez-Ponce de León & Garcia Prieto, 1997) Domingues & Boeger 2007 
 Acleotrema parastromatei (Rakotofiringa, Oliver & Lambert, 1987) Domingues & Boeger, 2007
 Acleotrema serrulopenis (Rakotofiringa, Oliver & Lambert, 1987)
 Acleotrema spiculare (Yamaguti, 1968)
 Acleotrema tamatavense (Rakotofiringa, Oliver & Lambert, 1987) 
 Acleotrema yamagutii (Oliver, 1983)

References

Diplectanidae
Monogenea genera